El Jícaro is a small town in the municipality of Tierra Blanca, in the Mexican state of Veracruz. It stands in the Río Papaloapan basin, at the 83rd kilometer of the Veracruz–Tierra Blanca railroad.

History of El Jícaro
El Jicaro  was founded around the 1920s on land that belonged to Don Joaquín Fernandez Mora, the offspring of large land owners ruined by the Mexican Revolution which began in 1910 and lasted for almost two decades. Given the country's political and economic situation of the time,  everyone, including  land owners  like Don Joaquín, entered the conflict, mainly to defend themselves. In the latter part of the 1920s, the country's situation began to change and a relative calm ensued. A friend and revolutionary comrade  of Don Joaquín's (a.k.a. "el perro negro"), Pedro Moreno asked him for  a plot of land to build a house for his family. Pedro Moreno built his house near the railroad that in those days did not have a stop in the area, where there were only the houses of Don Joaquín and Pedro Moreno. One day the train stopped near the quasi hamlet at the 83rd kilometer, to get water for the locomotive, which had run dry. They went up to Don Pedro's home to get water and they asked him what the place was called. He said it had no name. The engine driver told him to make one up. A little startled, for he had never thought of naming the place, Don Pedro looked around him for an idea to name the place. Suddenly he spotted  a "chomo" tree  full of green and round fruit, the size of a bowling ball, which is some kind of gourd, whose dry shell is used as a vessel and kitchen utensil. He said let's call it "El Jicaro", which is what the gourds are called in the local vernacular. From then on the place was known as "El Jicaro".

Eventually a cantina called el "chomito" run by a famous character named "Zapotito" would open up near the site of the famous "chomo" tree. The railway company built a station and soon people flocked from nearby areas to board the train up to the Port of Veracruz and the bigger town of Tierra Blanca. Pedro Moreno left the village never to be heard of again. But Don Joaquín remained in El Jícaro where he built his little empire, in spite of being left penniless by the Mexican Revolution and the agrarian reform; Don Joaquín lost the greater part of his land which covered a great expanse of the district (around 2000+ hectares). Most of the land was partitioned into communal land (ejido) and settled by many farmers, mostly of the Delgado and Aguirre clans. The communal land settlers made small lots near the railway where they had put the sign with the name of "El Jícaro km 83", and so a small village began to grow. Don Joaquín was left with the lands at the center of Jícaro extending from the San Pablo river to the Estanzuela river.

This area of Mexico being of tropical and torrid climate, has only two seasons, the dry season and the rainy season. Don Joaquin kept two homes, one in  town next to the railroad which he used for shipping the goods he produced in his ranches such as cotton, maize, charcoal, cheese and livestock. In the dry season the "finca" of "El Jobito" in "Paso 'e la Gloria" (his second abode near the Estanzuela river) was more appropriate for cattle grazing, so he would move the cattle ranching operations to this side of his property, approximately 8 km away, when the grasses in El Jicaro started to dry up.

Don Joaquín gave land in the center of town for an elementary school, a municipal agency and introduced electricity. Later, his  son Reyes(R.I.P.) donated land for both a kindergarten and  the senior high school. As time went by Don Joaquin became the richest man in the village. He was the owner of a general store in the middle of the little town which served as the main area for commerce and social events. He died in the 1970s, of a heart attack while visiting his longtime mistress Amada Amador. Many of his descendants still live in the village. In the 1980s, Clemente Moreno (Don Pedro's eldest son) went to El Jícaro to buy a house where he would retire. It is from him that we learned the anecdotal origin of this village's name.

Today, El Jicaro has drinkable water, sewer service, phone service, internet and a paved road. The railway has been made redundant as nobody travels or uses the train for transporting goods. The population of El Jicaro has been greatly diminished by the migration of its young people to other parts of the country and the United States. "Efforts" have been made by the local governments to create jobs. The most recent attempt was a projected ethanol distillery for use as an alternative fuel made from the abundant sugar cane in the area, but apparently it was cancelled. Most people say it was an all too common ploy to persuade people to vote for the current governor who is from the area. After he was elected to office he had to serve the larger interest groups, i.e., the massive state-owned monopoly Pemex that had recently discovered new oil and gas fields near Mata Gallina. This company does not employ locals as it has a largely politicized trade union.

External links

Populated places in Veracruz